Events from the year 1845 in Germany.

Incumbents
 King of Bavaria – Ludwig I
 King of Hanover – Ernest Augustus
 King of Prussia – Frederick William IV
 King of Saxony – Frederick Augustus II

Events 

 March 13 – The Violin Concerto by Felix Mendelssohn premieres in Leipzig, with Ferdinand David as soloist.
 October 19 – Richard Wagner's opera Tannhäuser debuts at the Dresden Royal Court Theater.

Date unknown 
 Friedrich Engels' treatise The Condition of the Working Class in England is published in Leipzig as Die Lage der arbeitenden Klasse in England. convincing Marx that the working class could be the agent and instrument of the final revolution in history.
 Heinrich Hoffmann publishes a book (Lustige Geschichten und drollige Bilder), introducing his character, Struwwelpeter, in Germany.

Births 

 January 7 – King Ludwig III of Bavaria (d. 1921)
 March 3 – Georg Cantor, German mathematician (d. 1918)
 March 27 – Wilhelm Röntgen, German physicist, Nobel Prize laureate (d. 1923)

Deaths 

 May 12- August Wilhelm Schlegel, German poet, translator and critic (b. 1767)
 July 12-Friedrich Ludwig Persius, German architect (b. 1803)

References

Bibliography

Years of the 19th century in Germany
Germany
Germany